Swainsley Tunnel is a tunnel on the route of the former Leek and Manifold Light Railway, which connected the market town of Leek with Hulme End, via Waterhouses, in Staffordshire, England. The tunnel is located between Ecton and Butterton. 

It was closed in 1939, along with the rest of the line from Waterhouses to Hulme End. Today, it is used as a shared bicycle, automobile and pedestrian tunnel. Due to its narrow width, there are enforced regulations on car users and there is a weight limit of three tons. The tunnel is located in a very deep cutting, running under a minor road.

The site of Butterton station was located at the north end of the tunnel, near the modern day Swainsley Farm; this is quite a distance from the village it was built to serve.

References

Staffordshire
Tunnels in England